This is the list of cathedrals in Finland sorted by denomination.

Lutheran
Cathedrals of the Evangelical Lutheran Church of Finland:
 Espoo Cathedral in Espoo
 Helsinki Cathedral in Helsinki
 Kuopio Cathedral in Kuopio
 Lapua Cathedral in Lapua
 Mikkeli Cathedral in Mikkeli
 Oulu Cathedral in Oulu
 Porvoo Cathedral in Porvoo
 Savonlinna Cathedral in Savonlinna
 Tampere Cathedral in Tampere
 Turku Cathedral in Turku

Eastern Orthodox

Cathedrals of the Finnish Orthodox Church:
 Uspenski Cathedral in Helsinki
 St. Nicholas Cathedral in Kuopio
 Holy Trinity Cathedral, Oulu

Roman Catholic
Cathedrals of the Roman Catholic church in Finland:
 St. Henrik's Cathedral in Helsinki

See also

List of cathedrals

References

 List of cathedrals in Finland
Finland
Cathedrals
Cathedrals